Molla Ahmad may refer to:
 Molla Ahmad, Ardabil
 Molla Ahmad, Gilan
 Molla Ahmad, West Azerbaijan